Markus Hümpfer (born 17 March 1992) is a German engineer and politician of the Social Democratic Party (SPD) who has been serving as a member of the Bundestag since 2021.

Political career
In the 2021 elections, Hümpfer became a member of the Bundestag, representing the Schweinfurt district. In parliament, he has since been serving on the Committee on Climate Action and Energy.

Within his parliamentary group, Hümpfer belongs to the Parliamentary Left, a left-wing movement.

Other activities
 Business Forum of the Social Democratic Party of Germany, Member of the Political Advisory Board (since 2022)

References 

Living people
1992 births
Social Democratic Party of Germany politicians
Members of the Bundestag 2021–2025
21st-century German politicians
People from Schweinfurt